was a Japanese philosopher of science, particularly of mathematics and physics. In 1947 he became a member of the Japan Academy, and in 1950 he received the Order of Cultural Merit.

Tanabe was a key member of what has become known in the West as the Kyoto School, alongside philosophers Kitaro Nishida and Keiji Nishitani. While the latter philosophers have received recognition in Western academia, Tanabe's writing has received less notice. Nishida, the figure who is considered the originator of this school, was Tanabe's teacher. Philosophers of this school received opprobrium for their perceived active role in the Japanese militarist regime. However, their participation in resistance to the political environment has been documented widely by James Heisig. Tanabe especially has fallen under scrutiny for his political activities, though scholarship provides some mitigation of the harsher stigma surrounding his career.

Biography

Tanabe was born on February 3, 1885, in Tokyo to a household devoted to education. His father, the principal of Kaisei Academy, was a scholar of Confucius, whose teachings may have influenced Tanabe's philosophical and religious thought. Tanabe enrolled at Tokyo Imperial University, first as a mathematics student before moving to literature and philosophy. After graduation, he worked as a lecturer at Tohoku University and taught English at Kaisei Academy.

In 1916, Tanabe translated Henri Poincaré’s La Valeur de la science. In 1918, he received his doctorate from Kyoto Imperial University with a dissertation entitled ‘Investigations into the Philosophy of Mathematics’ (predecessor to the 1925 book with the same title).

In 1919, at Nishida’s invitation, Tanabe accepted the position of associate professor at Kyoto Imperial University. From 1922 to 23, he studied in Germany — first, under Alois Riehl at the University of Berlin and then under Edmund Husserl at the University of Freiburg. At Freiburg, he befriended the young Martin Heidegger and Oskar Becker. One can recognise the influence of these philosophers in Tanabe.

In September 1923, soon after the Great Kantō Earthquake, the Home Ministry ordered his return, so Tanabe used the little time he had left — about a couple of months — to visit London and Paris, before boarding his return ship at Marseille. He arrived back in Japan in 1924.

In 1928, Tanabe translated Max Planck’s 1908 lecture, ‘Die Einheit des physikalischen Weltbildes’ for the Philosophical Essays [哲学論叢] translation series, which he co-edited, for his publisher Iwanami Shoten. The same series published translations of essays by Bruno Bauch, Adolf Reinach, Wilhelm Windelband, Siegfried Marck, Max Planck, Franz Brentano, Paul Natorp, Nicolai Hartmann, Kazimierz Twardowski, Ernst Cassirer, Hermann Cohen, Emil Lask, Victor Brochard, Ernst Troeltsch, Theodor Lipps, Konrad Fiedler, Wincenty Lutosławski, Sergei Rubinstein, Hermann Bonitz, Max Weber, Émile Durkheim, Martin Grabmann, Heinrich Rickert, Alexius Meinong, Karl von Prantl and Wilhelm Dilthey (the series ended before the planned translations of Christoph von Sigwart, Carl Stumpf, Edmund Husserl, Clemens Baeumker, Josiah Royce and Hermann Ebbinghaus were published).

After Nishida's retirement from teaching in 1928, Tanabe succeeded him. Though they began as friends, and shared several philosophical concepts such as the absolute nothing [絶対無], Tanabe became increasingly critical of Nishida's philosophy. Many of Tanabe's writings after Nishida left the university obliquely attacked the latter's philosophy.

In 1935, Tanabe published his essay ‘The Logic of Species and the World Schema’ wherein he formulated his own ‘logic of species’ for which he became known.

During the Japanese expansion and war effort, Tanabe worked with Nishida and others to maintain the right for free academic expression. Though he criticized the Nazi-inspired letter of Heidegger, Tanabe himself was caught up in the Japanese war effort, and his letters to students going off to war exhibit many of the same terms and ideology used by the reigning military powers. Even more damning are his essays written in defense of Japanese racial and state superiority, exploiting his theory of the Logic of Species to herald and abet the militaristic ideology. This proposed dialectic argued that every contradictory opposition is to be mediated by a third term in the same manner a species mediates a genus and an individual.

During the war years, however, Tanabe wrote and published little, perhaps reflecting the moral turmoil that he attests to in his monumental post-war work, Philosophy as Metanoetics. The work is framed as a confession of repentance (metanoia) for his support of the war effort. It purports to show a philosophical way to overcome philosophy itself, which suggests that traditional Western thought contained seeds of the ideological framework that led to World War II.

His activities, and the actions of Japan as a whole, haunted Tanabe for the rest of his life. In 1951, he writes:

He lived for another eleven years after writing these words, dying in 1962 in Kita-Karuizawa, Japan.

Thought
As James Heisig and others note, Tanabe and other members of the Kyoto School accepted the Western philosophical tradition stemming from the Greeks. This tradition attempts to explain the meaning of human experience in rational terms. This sets them apart from other Eastern writers who, though thinking about what life means and how best to live a good life, spoke in religious terms.

Although the Kyoto School used Western philosophical terminology and rational exploration, they made these items serve the purpose of presenting a unique vision of reality from within their cultural heritage. Specifically, they could enrich a discussion of the ultimate nature of reality using the experience and thought of various forms of Buddhism like Zen and Pure Land, but embedded in an analysis that calls upon conceptual tools forged and honed in western philosophy by thinkers ranging from Plato to Descartes to Heidegger.

Tanabe's own contribution to this dialog between Eastern and Western philosophy ultimately sets him apart from the other members of the Kyoto School. His radical critique of philosophical reason and method, while stemming from Immanuel Kant and Søren Kierkegaard, which emerges in his work Philosophy as Metanoetics, easily sets him as a major thinker with a unique position on perennial philosophical questions. Some commentators, for example, suggest that Tanabe's work in metanoetics is a forerunner of deconstruction.

Tanabe engaged with philosophers of Continental philosophy, especially Existentialism. His work is often a dialogue with philosophers like Kierkegaard, Friedrich Nietzsche, and Heidegger. Because of his engaging these thinkers, especially the first two, Tanabe's thought has been characterized as Existentialist, though Makoto Ozaki writes that Tanabe preferred the terms "existentialist philosophy of history", "historical existentialism", or "existential metaphysics of history". In his masterpiece, Philosophy as Metanoetics, Tanabe characterized his work as "philosophy that is not a philosophy", foreshadowing various approaches to thinking by deconstructionists.

Like other Existentialists, Tanabe emphasizes the importance of philosophy as being meaning; that is, what humans think about and desire is finding a meaning to life and death. In company with the other members of the Kyoto School, Tanabe believed that the foremost problem facing humans in the modern world is the lack of meaning and its consequent Nihilism. Jean-Paul Sartre, following Kierkegaard in his Concept of Anxiety, was keen to characterize this as Nothingness. Heidegger, as well, appropriated the notion of Nothingness in his later writings.

The Kyoto School philosophers believed that their contribution to this discussion of Nihilism centered on the Buddhist-inspired concept of nothingness, aligned with its correlate Sunyata. Tanabe and Nishida attempted to distinguish their philosophical use of this concept, however, by calling it Absolute Nothingness. This term differentiates it from the Buddhist religious concept of nothingness, as well as underlines the historical aspects of human existence that they believed Buddhism does not capture.

Tanabe disagreed with Nishida and Nishitani on the meaning of Absolute Nothingness, emphasizing the practical, historical aspect over what he termed the latter's intuitionism. By this, Tanabe hoped to emphasize the working of Nothingness in time, as opposed to an eternal Now. He also wished to center the human experience in action rather than contemplation, since he thought that action embodies a concern for ethics whereas contemplation ultimately disregards this, resulting in a form of Monism, after the mold of Plotinus and Georg Wilhelm Friedrich Hegel. That is, echoing Kierkegaard's undermining in Philosophical Fragments of systematic philosophy from Plato to Baruch Spinoza to Hegel, Tanabe questions whether there is an aboriginal condition of preexisting awareness that can or must be regained to attain enlightenment.

Tanabe's insistence on this point is not simply philosophical and instead points again to his insistence that the proper mode of human being is action, especially ethics. However, he is critical of the notion of a pre-existing condition of enlightenment because he accepts the Kantian notion of radical evil, wherein humans exhibit an ineluctable propensity to act against their own desires for the good and instead perpetrate evil.

Work

Demonstration of Christianity
Tanabe's "Demonstration of Christianity" presents religion as a cultural entity in tension with the existential meaning that religion plays in individual lives. Tanabe uses the terms genus to represent the universality of form that all entities strive for, contrasting them with the stable, though ossified form they can become as species as social systems.

Tanabe contraposes Christianity and Christ, represented here as the opposition between Paul and Jesus. Jesus, in Tanabe's terms, is a historical being who manifests the action of Absolute Nothingness, or God understood in non-theistic terms. God is beyond all conceptuality and human thinking, which can only occur in terms of self-identity, or Being. God becomes, as manifested in human actions, though God can never be reduced to being, or self-identity.

For Tanabe, humans have the potential to realize compassionate divinity, Nothingness, through continual death and resurrection, by way of seeing their nothingness. Tanabe believes that the Christian Incarnation narrative is important for explaining the nature of reality, since he believed Absolute Nothingness becoming human exemplifies the true nature of the divine, as well as exemplar to realization of human being in relationship to divinity. Jesus signifies this process in a most pure form, thereby setting an example for others to follow.

Ultimately, Tanabe chooses philosophy over religion, since the latter tends toward socialization and domestication of the original impulse of the religious action. Philosophy, understood as metanoetics, always remains open to questions and the possibility self-delusion in the form of radical evil. Therefore, Tanabe's statement is a philosophy of religion.

Bibliography

Primary sources

Collected Works [田辺元全集] 15 vols. (Chikuma Shobō [筑摩書房], 1963–64) [CW].

Monographs

 Modern Natural Science [最近の自然科学] (Iwanami Shoten [岩波書店], November 1915), reprinted in CW2:1-153.
 Outline of Science [科学概論] (Iwanami Shoten [岩波書店], September 1918), reprinted in CW2:155-360.
 Kant’s Teleology [カントの目的論] (Iwanami Shoten [岩波書店], October 1924), reprinted in CW3:1-72.
 Investigations into the Philosophy of Mathematics [数理哲学研究] (Iwanami Shoten [岩波書店], May 1925), reprinted in CW2:361-661.
 Hegel’s Philosophy and the Dialectic [ヘーゲル哲学と弁証法] (Iwanami Shoten [岩波書店], January 1932), reprinted in CW3:73-369.
 General Philosophy [哲学通論] (Iwanami Shoten [岩波書店], December 1933), reprinted in CW3:371-522.
 The Two Sides to Natural Science Education [自然科学教育の両側面] (Monbushō [文部省], March 1937), reprinted in CW5:141-191.
 Between Philosophy and Science [哲学と科学の間] (Iwanami Shoten [岩波書店], November 1939), reprinted in CW5:193-327.
 My View of the Philosophy of Shōbōgenzō [正法眼蔵の哲学私観] (Iwanami Shoten [岩波書店], May 1939), reprinted in CW5:443-494.
 Historical Reality [歴史的現実] (Iwanami Shoten [岩波書店], June 1940), reprinted in CW8:117-169.
 Philosophy as a Way to Repentance: Metanoetics [懺悔道としての哲学] (Iwanami Shoten [岩波書店], April 1946), reprinted in CW9:1-269.
 Urgent Matters for Political Philosophy [政治哲学の急務] (Chikuma Shobō [筑摩書房], June 1946), reprinted in CW8:323-395.
 Dialectic of the Logic of Species [種の論理の弁証法] (Akitaya [秋田屋], November 1947), reprinted in CW7:251-372.
 Existence, Love and Practice [実存と愛と実践] (Chikuma Shobō [筑摩書房], December 1947), reprinted in CW9:271-492.
 Demonstration of Christianity [キリスト教の弁証] (Chikuma Shobō [筑摩書房], June 1948), reprinted in CW10:1-269.
 Introduction to Philosophy: The Fundamental Problems of Philosophy [哲学入門 哲学の根本問題] (Chikuma Shobō [筑摩書房], March 1949), reprinted in CW11:1-132.
 The Fundamental Problems of Philosophy, Appendix 1: Philosophy of History and Political Philosophy [哲学の根本問題 補説第一 歴史哲学・政治哲学] (Chikuma Shobō [筑摩書房], September 1949), reprinted in CW11:133-282.
 The Fundamental Problems of Philosophy, Appendix 2: Philosophy of Science and Epistemology [哲学の根本問題 補説第二 科学哲学・認識論] (Chikuma Shobō, April 1950), reprinted in CW11:283-425.
 Valéry’s Aesthetics [ヴァレリイの芸術哲学] (Chikuma Shobō [筑摩書房], March 1951), reprinted in CW13:1-162.
 Fundamental Problems of Philosophy, Appendix 3: Philosophy of Religion and Ethics [哲学の根本問題 補説第三 宗教哲学・倫理学] (Chikuma Shobō [筑摩書房], April 1952), reprinted in CW11:427-632.
 A Historicist Further Development of Mathematics: A Memorandum on the Foundations of Mathematics [数理の歴史主義展開——数学基礎論覚書] (Chikuma Shobō [筑摩書房], November 1954), reprinted in CW12:209-334.
 Proposition of a New Methodology for Theoretical Physics: The Necessity of Theory of Functions of Complex Variables qua Method of Theoretical Physics and Its Topological Character [理論物理学新方法論提説——理論物理学の方法としての複素変数関数論の必然性とその位相学的性格] (Chikuma Shobō [筑摩書房], May 1955), reprinted in CW12:335-368.
 Dialectic of the Theory of Relativity [相対性理論の弁証法] (Chikuma Shobō [筑摩書房], October 1955), reprinted in CW12:369-402.
 A Memorandum on Mallarmé [マラルメ覚書] (Chikuma Shobō [筑摩書房], August 1961), reprinted in CW13:199-304.

Essays

CW1: Early Essays [初期論文集]

 ‘On Thetic Judgements’ [措定判断について] (Tetsugaku Zasshi [哲学雑誌], No. 283, September 1910), reprinted in CW1:1-10.
 A reworking of Tanabe’s graduation essay from 1908.

 ‘The Significance of Descriptions in the Epistemology of Physics: A Critique of Kirchhoff and Mach’ [物理学的認識における記載の意義——キルヒホッフ及びマッハの批評]  (Tetsugaku Zasshi [哲学雑誌], No. 319, September 1913), reprinted in CW1:11-26.
 On the descriptivism of Kirchhoff and Mach.

 ‘The Limits of Logicism in Epistemology: A Critique of the Marburg and Freiburg Schools’ [認識論における論理主義の限界——マールブルヒ派とフライブルヒ派の批評] (Tetsugaku Zasshi [哲学雑誌], No. 324, February 1914), reprinted in CW1:27-62.
 ‘The Natural Sciences versus the Social and Cultural Sciences’ [自然科学対精神科学・文化科学] (Shinri Kenkyū [心理研究], Nos. 38-40, February–April 1915), reprinted in CW1:63-94.
 DOI: 10.4992/jjpsy1912.7.316, 10.4992/jjpsy1912.7.421, 10.4992/jjpsy1912.7.534

 ‘On Universals’ [普遍について] (Tetsugaku Kenkyū [哲学研究], No. 5, May 1916), reprinted in CW1:95-118.
 ‘Moral Freedom’ [道徳的自由] (Shichō [思潮], Vol. 1, Nos. 3-4, July–August 1917), reprinted in CW1:119-40.
 ‘The Theory of Time’ [時間論] (Tetsugaku Kenkyū [哲学研究], No. 17, August 1917), reprinted in CW1:141-72.
 ‘The Problem of Philosophical Knowledge in German Idealism’ [ドイツ唯心論における哲学的認識の問題] (Tetsugaku Kenkyū [哲学研究], Nos. 23-4, February–March 1918), reprinted in CW1:173-226.
 ‘The World of Infinity’ [無限の世界] (Shichō [思潮], Vol. 2, No. 5, August 1918), reprinted in CW1:227-34.
 ‘A Request for Dr. Sōda’s Thoughts on the Logic of Individual Causality’ [個別的因果律の論理につきて左右田博士の教えを請う] (Tetsugaku Kenkyū [哲学研究], No. 30, October 1918), reprinted in CW1:235-44.
 ‘On Kant’s Theory of Freedom’ [カントの自由論について] (Shichō [思潮], Vol. 2, No. 9, October 1918), reprinted in CW1:245-54.
 ‘The Significance of Leibniz’s Philosophy [ライプニッツ哲学の意義] (Tetsugaku Kenkyū [哲学研究], No. 32, November 1918), reprinted in CW1:255-84.
 ‘The Meaning of the Word ‘Truth’’ [真という語の意味] (Shichō [思潮], Vol. 3, January 1919), reprinted in CW1:285-96.
 ‘On Consciousness as Such’ [「意識一般」について] (Tetsugaku Zasshi [哲学雑誌], No. 387, May 1919), reprinted in CW1:297-324.
 On Kant’s notion of »Bewußtsein überhaupt«.

 ‘The Problem of the Subject of Knowledge’ [認識主観の問題] (Tetsugaku Kenkyū [哲学研究], Nos. 44-47, 1919-21), reprinted in CW1:325-412.
 ‘On Historical Knowledge’ [歴史の認識について] (Shirin [史林], Vol. 7, No. 1, January 1922), reprinted in CW1:413-22.
 DOI: 10.14989/shirin_7_33

 ‘The Concept of Culture’ [文化の概念] (Kaizō [改造], March 1922), reprinted in CW1:423-48.
 ‘The Infinite Continuity of Existence’ [実在の無限連続性] (Shisō [思想], No. 6, March 1922), reprinted in CW1:449-72.

CW4: Early to Middle Essays [初期・中期論文集]

 ‘The Relationship Between Intuition and Thought in the Transcendental Deduction’ [先験演繹論における直観と思惟との関係]  (Shisō [思想], No. 30, April 1924), reprinted in CW4:1-16.
 ‘A New Turn in Phenomenology: Heidegger’s Phenomenology of Life’ [現象学における新しき転向——ハイデッガーの生の現象学] (Shisō [思想], No. 36, October 1924), reprinted in CW4:17-34.
 ‘Epistemology and Phenomenology’ [認識論と現象学] (Kōza [講座], Nos. 24-25, January–February 1925), reprinted in CW4:35-71.
 ‘Intuitive Knowledge and the Thing in Itself’ [直観知と物自体] (Tetsugaku Kenkyū [哲学研究], Nos. 109 and 112 and 128, April and July 1925 and November 1926), reprinted in CW4:73-139.
 Intuitive knowledge as in Spinoza’s scientia intuitiva.

 ‘Lask’s Logic’ [ラスクの論理] (Shisō [思想], No. 40, October 1925), reprinted in CW4:141-160.
 ‘Reflection’ [反省作用] (Festschrift for Tokunō Bun [得能博士還暦記念哲学論文集], Iwanami Shoten [岩波書店], June 1925), reprinted in CW4:161-205.
 ‘On Circular Reasoning in the Critical Method’ [批判的方法における循環論について] (Shisō [思想], No. 64, February 1927), reprinted in CW4:207-229.
 ‘On the Concept of Sensation’ [感覚の概念について] (Shinrigaku Kenkyū [心理学研究], Vol. 2, No. 3, June 1927) reprinted in CW4:231-239.
 DOI: 10.4992/jjpsy.2.439

 ‘Knowledge of the Past in the Study of History’ [史学における過去の認識] (Tetsugaku Kenkyū [哲学研究], No. 142, January 1928), reprinted in CW4:241-256.
 ‘The Role of Concepts in the Historical Knowledge’ [歴史の認識における概念の機能] (Shirin [史林], Vol. 13, No. 2, April 1928), reprinted in CW4:257-269.
 DOI: 10.14989/shirin_13_181

 ‘The Location of Evidence’ [明証の所在] (Tetsugaku Zasshi [哲学雑誌], No. 500, October 1928), reprinted in CW4:271-286.
 ‘On Confucian Ontology’ [儒教的存在論について] (Festschrift for Takase Takejirō [高瀬博士還暦記念支那学論叢], Iwanami Shoten [岩波書店], November 1928), reprinted in CW4:287-301.
 ‘A Request for Professor Nishida’s Thoughts’ [西田先生の教えを仰ぐ] (Tetsugaku Kenkyū [哲学研究], No. 170, May 1930), reprinted in CW4:303-328.
 ‘Synthesis and Transcendence’ [綜合と超越] (Festschrift for Tomonaga Sanjūrō [朝永博士還暦記念哲学論文集], Iwanami Shoten [岩波書店], April 1931), reprinted in CW4:329-353.
 ‘The Standpoint of Anthropology’ [人間学の立場] (Risō [理想], No. 27, October 1931), reprinted in CW4:355-382.
 ‘Dialectic of Individual Essence’ [個体的本質の弁証論] (Spinoza and Hegel [スピノザとヘーゲル], Iwanami Shoten [岩波書店], July 1932), reprinted in CW4:383-415.

CW5: Middle Essays [中期論文集]

 ‘The Way to Philosophy’ [哲学への通路] (Shisō [思想], No. 133, June 1933), reprinted in CW5:1-20.
 ‘The Relationship Between Mathematics and Philosophy’ [数学と哲学との関係] (Iwanami Kōza: Sūgaku [岩波講座　数学], May 1934), reprinted in CW5:21-58.
 ‘The Relationship Between Religion and Culture: On the Debate Between Barth and Brunner’ [宗教と文化の関係——バルトとブルンナーの論争に因みて] (Shisō [思想], No. 153, October 1934), reprinted in CW5:59-80.
 ‘On Humanism’ [ヒューマニズムについて] (Shisō [思想], No. 173, October 1936), reprinted in CW5:81-92.
 ‘The Development of Mathematics in the History of Thought’ [思想史的に見たる数学の発達] (Mathematics as General Education [一般的教養としての数学について], Iwanami Shoten [岩波書店], November 1936), reprinted in CW5:93-140.
 Science as Morality [徳性としての科学] (Tokyo: Sūgakukyoku [数学局], August 1938), reprinted in CW5:329-84.
 ‘Logic from Kant to Hegel’ [カントからヘーゲルへの論理] (Festschrift for Hatano Sei’ichi [波多野精一先生献呈論文集], Iwanami Shoten [岩波書店], September 1938), reprinted in CW5:385-404.
 ‘Physics and Philosophy’ [物理学と哲学] (Iwanami Kōza: Butsurigaku, Vol. 13 [岩波講座　物理学 第13巻], October 1939), reprinted in CW5:405-44.

CW6: Essays on the Logic of Species, Vol. 1 [「種の論理」論文集I]

 ‘From the Time Schema to the World Schema’ [図式「時間」から図式「世界」へ] (Tetsugaku Kenkyū [哲学研究], No. 200, November 1932), reprinted in CW6:1-50.
 ‘The Logic of Social Existence’ [社会存在の論理] (Tetsugaku Kenkyū [哲学研究], Nos. 224-226, November 1934-January 1935), reprinted in CW6:51-168
 ‘The Logic of Species and the World Schema’ [種の論理と世界図式] (Tetsugaku Kenkyū [哲学研究], Nos. 235-237, October-December 1935), reprinted in CW6:169-264.
 ‘The Third Stage of Ontology’ [存在論の第三段階] (Risō [理想], No. 76, November 1935), reprinted in CW6:265-98.
 ‘The Social Ontological Structure of Logic’ [論理の社会存在論的構造] (Tetsugaku Kenkyū [哲学研究], Nos. 247-249, October-December 1936), reprinted in CW6:299-396.
 ‘Response to Criticisms of the Logic of Species’ [種の論理に対する批評に答える] (Shisō [思想], No. 185, October 1937), reprinted in CW6:397-446.
 ‘Clarification of the Meaning of the Logic of Species’ [種の論理の意味を明にす] (Tetsugaku Kenkyū [哲学研究], Nos. 259-261, October-December 1937), reprinted in CW6:447-522.

CW7: Essays on the Logic of Species, Vol. 2 [「種の論理」論文集II]

 ‘The Limits of Existentialist Philosophy’ [実存哲学の限界] (Tetsugaku Zasshi [哲学雑誌], No. 620, October 1938), reprinted in CW7:1-24.
 ‘The Logic of National Existence’ [国家的存在の論理] (Tetsugaku Kenkyū [哲学研究], No. 283, October-December 1939), reprinted in CW7:25-100.
 ‘Eternity, History, Action’ [永遠・歷史・行為] (Tetsugaku Kenkyū [哲学研究], Nos. 295-297, October-December 1940), reprinted in CW7:101-70.
 ‘Ethics and Logic’ [倫理と論理] (Iwanami Kōza: Rinrigaku, Vol. 4 [岩波講座 倫理学 第四冊], November 1940), reprinted in CW7:171-210.
 ‘The Development of the Concept of Existence’ [実存概念の発展] (Tetsugaku Kenkyū [哲学研究], Nos. 307 and 309, October and December 1941), reprinted in CW7:211-51.

CW8: Occasional Essays [時事論文集]

 ‘Philosophy of Crisis or Crisis of Philosophy?’ [危機の哲学か哲学の危機か], reprinted in CW8:1-10.
 ‘Response to Minoda’s and Matsuda’s Criticisms’ [蓑田氏および松田氏の批判に答える], reprinted in CW8:11-32.
 ‘The Meaning of Historical Study’ [史学の意味], reprinted in CW8:33-92.
 ‘The Expansion of Scientism’ [科学主義の拡充], reprinted in CW8:93-104.
 ‘My View on the Principle Underlying the Direction of Japan’s Cultural Policy Towards China’ [対支文化政策の指導原理に関する私見], reprinted in CW8:105-70.
 ‘The Direction of Philosophy’ [哲学の方向], reprinted in CW8:171-200.
 ‘The Morality of the State’ [国家の道義性], reprinted in CW8:201-20.
 ‘The Way of Patriotic Thinking’ [思想報国の道], reprinted in CW8:221-42.
 ‘Life and Death’ [死生], reprinted in CW8:243-62.
 ‘The Limits of Culture’ [文化の限界], reprinted in CW8:263-306.
 ‘The Establishment of Democracy in Japan’ [日本民主主義の確立], reprinted in CW8:307-22.
 ‘The Standpoint of the Absolute Nothing and the Materialist Dialectic’ [絶対無の立場と唯物弁証法] (1946), reprinted in CW8:397-410.
 ‘The Present Task of the Intellectual Classes’ [知識階級現在の任務], reprinted in CW8:411-42.
 ‘A Theoretical Solution to Class Warfare’ [階級戦の理論的突破] (written in March 1948, unpublished), reprinted in CW8:443-62.

CW10

 ‘Christianity, Marxism and Japanese Buddhism: Predictions for the Second Reformation’ [キリスト教とマルクシズムと日本仏教——第二次宗教改革の予想] (Tenbō [展望], No. 21, September 1947), reprinted in CW10:271-324.

CW12: Essays in the Philosophy of Science [科学哲学論文集] (1948-50)

 ‘Localised and Microscopic: Characteristics of Contemporary Thought’ [局所的微視的——現代的思考の特徴] (Tenbō [展望], No. 35, November 1948), reprinted in CW12:1-58.
 ‘Dialectic of Classical Mechanics’ [古典力学の弁証法] (Kiso Kagaku [基礎科学], No. 2, April 1949), reprinted in CW12:59-131
 ‘Science, Philosophy and Religion’ [科学と哲学と宗教] (Chikuma Shobō Tetsugaku Kōza [筑摩書房 哲学講座], Vol. 4, March 1950), reprinted in CW12:132-210.

CW13: Late and Posthumous Essays [後期論文集・遺稿]

 ‘Memento Mori’ [メメント・モリ] (Shinano Kyōiku [信濃教育], No. 858, May 1958), reprinted in CW13:163-175.
 ‘My Interpretation of the Chan Preface’ [禅源私解] (Festschrift for D. T. Suzuki [鈴木大拙博士記念論文集], October 1960), reprinted in CW13:177-198.
 ‘Philosophy, Poetry and Religion: Heidegger, Rilke, Hölderlin’ [哲学と詩と宗教——ハイデッガー・リルケ・ヘルダーリン] (begun in 1953, unfinished), reprinted in CW13:305-524.
 ‘Ontology of Life or Dialectic of Death?’ [生の存在学か死の弁証法か] (Tetsugaku Kenkyū [哲学研究], No. 483, November 1962), reprinted in CW13:525-576.

CW14: Miscellanea, Vol. 1 [雑纂 上]

 ‘Review of Theodor Lipps, Bewusstsein und Gegenstände’ [リップス氏『意識と対象』] (Tetsugaku Zasshi [哲学雑誌], No. 285, November 1910), reprinted in CW14:3-10.
 ‘Review of Wilhelm Jerusalem, Der kritische Idealismus und die reine Logik’ [イェルザレム氏の『批判的観念論と純粋論理学』] (Tetsugaku Zasshi [哲学雑誌], No. 292-3, June–July 1911), reprinted in CW14:11-32.
 ‘The Problem of Relativity’ [相対性の問題] (Tetsugaku Zasshi [哲学雑誌], No. 302, April 1912), reprinted in CW14:33-48.
 ‘Kant and the Natural Sciences’ [カントと自然科学] (Tetsugaku Zasshi [哲学雑誌], No. 306, August 1912), reprinted in CW14:49-60.
 ‘Review of Émile Boutroux, De l’idée de loi naturelle dans la science et la philosophie contemporaines’ [ブートルー氏『自然法の観念』] (Tetsugaku Zasshi [哲学雑誌], No. 307-9, September–November 1912), reprinted in CW14:61-104.
 ‘Review of Kuwaki Ayao, ‘The Problem of Knowledge in Physics’’ [桑木理学士の『物理学上認識の問題』] (Tetsugaku Zasshi [哲学雑誌], No. 310, December 1912), reprinted in CW14:105-13.
 ‘Review of Max Planck, ‘Die Einheit des physkalischen Weltbildes’’ [プランク氏『物理学的世界形象の統一』] (Tetsugaku Zasshi [哲学雑誌], No. 313-5, March–May 1913), reprinted in CW14:114-39.
 ‘Natorp’s Criticisms of the Principle of Relativity’ [相対性原理に対するナトルプ氏の批評]  (Tetsugaku Zasshi [哲学雑誌], No. 318, August 1913), reprinted in CW14:140-52.
 ‘Review of Henri Poincaré, ‘L'espace et le temps’’ [ポアンカレ氏『空間と時間』]  (Tetsugaku Zasshi [哲学雑誌], No. 322, December 1913), reprinted in CW14:153-64.
 ‘Kuwaki’s Essay on the Method of Physics’ [桑木理学士の物理学の方法に関する一論文]  (Tetsugaku Zasshi [哲学雑誌], No. 325, March 1914), reprinted in CW14:165-8.
 ‘On the Existence of Mathematical Objects: Reading Medicus’ Essay’ [数学的対象の存在について——メディクスの論文を読む]  (Tetsugaku Zasshi [哲学雑誌], No. 331, September 1914), reprinted in CW14:169-92.
 The essay in question is Fritz Medicus, ‘Bemerkungen zum Problem der Existenz mathematischer Gegenstände’, Kant-Studien, 19:1-19.

 ‘Preface to the Third Edition of Modern Natural Science’ [『最近の自然科学』第三版の序] (December 1915), reprinted in CW14:193.
 ‘Translator’s Preface to Poincaré, La valeur de la science’ [ポアンカレ『科学の価値』訳者序] (May 1916), reprinted in CW14:194-5.
 ‘Reading Dr. Sōda’s Problems in the Philosophy of Economics’ [左右田博士の著『経済哲学の諸問題』を読む] (Tetsugaku Kenkyū [哲学研究], No. 26, May 1918), reprinted in CW14:196-202.
 ‘A Remark on Passages Quoted in Kihira’s Essay’ [紀平学士論文中の引用句につき一言す]  (Tetsugaku Zasshi [哲学雑誌], No. 391, September 1919), reprinted in CW14:203-4.
 ‘Translator’s Preface to Planck, ‘Die Einheit des physkalischen Weltbildes’’ [プランク『物理学的世界像の統一』訳者小引] (July 1927), reprinted in CW14:205-6.
 ‘On the So-Called Class Aspect of Science’ [いわゆる「科学の階級性」について] (Kaizō [改造], Vol. 12, No. 1, January 1930), reprinted in CW14:207-21.
 ‘The Significance of the New Physics’ World Picture’ [新物理学的世界像の意義] (Iwanami Kōza: Butsurigaku Oyobi Kagaku [岩波講座 物理学及び化学], October 1930), reprinted in CW14:222-38.
 ‘Re-Examining the Foundations of Mathematics: On Konno’s Essay’ [数学の基礎再吟味——今野氏の論文に因みて] (Kagaku [科学], Vol. 4, No. 8, August 1934), reprinted in CW14:239-45.
 ‘Inayaga Shōkichi, The Foundational Concepts of Modern Mathematics, Vol. 1’ [彌永昌吉『現代数学基礎概念（上）』] (Kagaku [科学], Vol. 15, No. 2, October 1945), reprinted in CW14:246-9
 ‘Oskar Becker, Die Grundlagen der Mathematik in geschichtlicher Entwicklung’ [オスカー・ベッカー教授の『数学基礎発展史』] (Kagaku Kisoron Kenkyū, Vol. 1, No. 3, March 1955; DOI: 10.4288/kisoron1954.1.3_145), reprinted in CW14:250-2.
 ‘The Natural Sciences and the Social Sciences’ [自然科学と文化科学], reprinted in CW14:253-83.
 ‘On Scientific Thinking’ [科学思想について], reprinted in CW14:284-314.

CW15: Miscellanea, Vol. 2 [雑纂 下]

 ‘Lecture on Idealism’ [理想主義] (1918), reprinted in CW15:3-34.
 ‘Lecture on the Development of Phenomenology’ [現象学の発展] (1924-5), reprinted in CW15:35-154.
 ‘Lecture on the Meaning of Dialectic’ [弁証法の意味] (1932-7), reprinted in CW15:155-234.
 ‘Lecture on Philosophy’ [哲学について] (1942), reprinted in CW15:235-48.
 ‘Lecture on Philosophical Thinking’ [哲学的思考] (1946), reprinted in CW15:249-86.
 ‘Special Lecture at Kita-Karuizawa [北軽井沢特別講義] (May 1-3 and October 1-3, 1953), reprinted in CW15:287-420.
 Entries in the Dictionary of Philosophy [哲学辞典] (Tokyo: Iwanami Shoten [岩波書店], 1922), reprinted in CW15:421-67.

 Archimedes’ axiom [アルキメデス公理]; Körper α [アルファ体]; Analysis situs [位置解析]; Ether [エーテル]; Energetic view of nature [エネルギー観]; Principle of conservation of energy [エネルギー保存則]; Action at a distance [遠隔作用]; Entropy [エントロピー]; Extensive quality [外延量]; Analysis [解析]; Analytical geometry [解析幾何学]; Critique of science [科学批判]; Reversible phenomenon [可逆現象]; Function [関数]; Mechanical view of nature [機械観]; Geometry [幾何学]; Pseudo-spherical space [擬球面空間]; Description [記述]; Descriptive school [記述学派]; Cardinal number [基数]; Series [級数]; Spherical space [球面空間]; Limit [極限]; Grenzpunkt [極限点]; Method of limit [極限法]; Grenzelement [極限要素]; Ortzeit [局所時]; Imaginary number [虚数]; Modern geometry [近世幾何学]; Space curvature [空間曲率]; Contingency [偶然]; Group [群]; Principle of permanence of formal laws [形式不易の原理]; Metrical geometry [計量幾何学]; Atomic theory [原子論]; Ausdehnungslehre [広遠論]; Theory of probability [公算論]; Postulate [公準]; Axiom [公理]; Axiomatic [公理主義]; Coordinates [座標]; Theory of economy of thought [思惟経済説]; Dimension [次元]; Quaternions [四元法]; Self-representation system [自己表現体系]; Natural science [自然科学]; Naturwissenschaftlich [自然科学的]; Natural number [自然数]; Gedankenexperiment [思想実験]; Real number [実数]; Mass [質量]; Projection [射影]; Projective geometry [射影幾何学]; Ordinal number [序数]; Number [数]; Mathematics [数学]; Mathematical [数学的]; Mathematical induction [数学的帰納法]; Mathematical formalism [数学的形式主義]; Mathematical realism [数学的実在論]; Mathematical nominalism [数学的唯名論]; Realm/Corpus of numbers [数体]; Number continuum [数連続体]; Arithmetisation [数論化]; Welt [世界]; Integral [積分]; Integer [整数]; Absolute space [絶対空間]; Absolute time [絶対時間]; Schnitt [切断]; Explanation [説明]; Exact sciences [精密科学]; Prime number [素数]; Theory of quanta [素量説]; Algebraic number [代数的数]; Field of force [力の場]; Transcendental number [超越的数]; Transfinite aggregate [超限集合]; Transfinite number [超限数];  Electromagnetic view of nature [電磁観/電磁的自然観]; Set of points [点集合]; Electron theory [電子論]; Punktmannigfaltigkeit [点複素体]; Point transformation [点変換]; Statistical mechanics [統計的力学]; Homogeneity [等質性]; Isotropy [等方性]; Intensive quantity [内包量]; First law of thermodynamics [熱力学第一法則]; Second law of thermodynamics [熱力学第二法則]; Physical theory of light [光の物理学的理論]; Differential [微分]; Differential coefficient [微分係数]; Infinitesimal method [微分法]; Differential equation [微分方程式]; Non-Euclidean geometry [非ユークリッド幾何学]; To represent [表現する]; Irreversible phenomenon [不可逆現象]; Complex number [複素数]; Negative number [負数]; Principle of conservation of matter [物質保存の原理]; Fourth state of matter [物質の第四態]; Disintegration of matter [物質変脱]; Physics [物理学]; Physical [物理的]; Invariant [不変式]; Mathesis universalis [普遍数学]; Fraction [分数]; Transformation [変換]; Variable [変数]; Parabolic space [放物線空間]; Elements at infinity [無窮遠要素]; Infinity [無限]; Irrational number [無理数]; Euclidean geometry [ユークリッド幾何学]; Rational number [有理数]; Dynamics/Mechanics [力学]; Riemann-Helmholtz geometry [リーマン・ヘルムホルツ幾何学]; Fluxion [流率]; Quantity [量]; Continuity [連続]; Lobachevsky-Bolyai geometry [ロバチェフスキィ・ボリヤイ幾何学]; Logistic/Algebra of logic [論理計算]; Vector analysis [ヴェクトル解析]

 Entries in the Dictionary of Pedagogy [哲学辞典] (Tokyo: Iwanami Shoten, 1936), reprinted in CW15:468-74.

 Philosophy of mathematics [数理哲学]; Methodology [方法論]

English translations 

Early Works (1910–1919)

 "The Logic of the Species as Dialectics," trans. David Dilworth and Taira Sato, in Monumenta Nipponica, Vol. 24, No. 3 (1969): 273–88.
 "Kant's Theory of Freedom," trans. Takeshi Morisato with Cody Staton in "An Essay on Kant’s Theory of Freedom from the Early Works of Tanabe Hajime" in Comparative and Continental Philosophy, vol. 5 (2013): 150–156.
 "On the Universal," trans. Takeshi Morisato with Timothy Burns, in "Groundwork for the Metaphysics of Deductive Reasoning: The Relation of the Universal and the Particular in Early Works of Tanabe Hajime" in Comparative and Continental Philosophy, vol. 5 (2013): 124–149.

Middle Work (1920–1930)

 "Requesting the Guidance of Professor Nishida," trans., Richard Stone and Takeshi Morisato, Asian philosophical Texts: Exploring Hidden Sources, eds., Roman Pasca and Takeshi Morisato, 281–308. Milan: Mimesis, 2020.

Logic of Species (1931–1945)

 (Forthcoming) "The Social Ontological Structure of the Logic," Tanabe Hajime and the Kyoto School: Self, World, and Knowledge. London: Bloomsbury, 2021.

Later Works (1946–1962)

 Philosophy as Metanoetics, trans. Takeuchi Yoshinori, Valdo Viglielmo, and James W. Heisig, University of California Press, 1987.
 "Demonstration of Christianity", in Introduction to the philosophy of Tanabe: According to the English translation of the seventh chapter of the demonstratio of Christianity,  trans. Makoto Ozaki, Rodopi Bv Editions, 1990.

Secondary sources

Books and theses 

 Adams, Robert William, "The feasibility of the philosophical in early Taishô Japan: Nishida Kitarô and Tanabe Hajime." PhD diss., University of Chicago, 1991.
 Dilworth, David A. and Valdo H. Viglielmo (translators and editors); with Agustin Jacinto Zavala, Sourcebook for modern Japanese philosophy : selected documents, Westport, Conn. : Greenwood Press, 1998.
 Fredericks, James L., "Alterity in the thought of Tanabe Hajime and Karl Rahner." PhD diss., University of Chicago, 1988.
 Heisig, James W., Philosophers of Nothingness: An Essay on the Kyoto School, Nanzan Library of Asian Religion and Culture, University of Hawaii Press, 2002.
 Morisato, Takeshi, Faith and Reason in Continental and Japanese Philosophy: Reading Tanabe Hajime and William Desmond, London: Bloomsbury, 2019. 
 Ozaki, Makoto, Individuum, Society, Humankind: The Triadic Logic of Species According to Hajime Tanabe (Brill's Japanese Studies Library), Brill Academic Publishers (April 2001), .
 Pattison, George, Agnosis: Theology in the Void, Palgrave Macmillan (February 1997), . .
 Unno, Taitetsu, and James W. Heisig (Editor), The Religious Philosophy of Tanabe Hajime: The Metanoetic Imperative (Nanzan Studies in Religion and Culture), Asian Humanities Press (June 1990),  .

Articles 

 Cestari, Matteo, "Between Emptiness and Absolute Nothingness: Reflections on Negation in Nishida and Buddhism."
 Ruiz, F. Perez, "Philosophy in Present-day Japan," in Monumenta Nipponica  Vol. 24, No. 1/2 (1969), pp. 137–168.
 Heisig, James W., "Tanabe's Logic of the Specific and the Critique of the Global Village,"  in Eastern Buddhist, Autumn95, Vol. 28 Issue 2, p198.
 Sakai, Naoki, "SUBJECT AND SUBSTRATUM : ON JAPANESE IMPERIAL NATIONALISM," in Cultural Studies; Jul2000, Vol. 14 Issue 3/4, p462-530 (AN 4052788)
 Viglielmo, V. H., "An Introduction to Tanabe Hajime's Existence, Love, and Praxis" in Wandel zwischen den Welten: Festschrift für Johannes Laube, (Peter Lang, 2003) pp. 781–797.
 Waldenfels, Hans, "Absolute Nothingness. Preliminary Considerations on a Central Notion in the Philosophy of Nishida Kitaro and the Kyoto School," in Monumenta Nipponica, Vol. 21, No. 3/4 (1966), 354–391.
 Williams, David, "In defence of the Kyoto School: reflections on philosophy, the Pacific War and the making of a post-White world," in Japan Forum, Sep2000, Vol. 12 Issue 2, 143–156.

Online links

 Bracken, Joseph, "Absolute Nothingness and The Divine Matrix"
 Buri, Fritz, "Hajime Tanabe, Philosophy of repentance and Dialectic of Death," in The Buddha-Christ as the Lord of the True Self: The Religious Philosophy of the Kyoto School, trns. by Harold H. Oliver, Mercer University Press, 1997, pp. 65–94. [via Google Books]
 Driscoll, Mark, "Apoco-elliptic Thought in Modern Japanese Philosophy"
 Hajime, Tanabe, Jitsuzon to ai to jissen (Existence, Love, and Praxis) [1947], (from vol. 9, Complete Works of Tanabe Hajime), Tokyo, Chikuma Shobô, 1963. A partial translation by V. H. Viglielmo , for which the Preface, Chapter One, and translator's introductory essay are published in “An Introduction to Tanabe Hajime’s Existence, Love, and Praxis." in Wandel zwischen den Welten: Festschrift für Johannes Laube, Peter Lang, 2003.
 Mierzejewska, Anna, "The Buddhist Inspiration of The Concept of Faith in The Philosophy of Hajime Tanabe," in SILVA IAPONICARUM, FASC. VI・第六号, WINTER ・冬 2005, pp. 18–37.
 Odin, Steve, "Hajime Tanabe," in The Social Self in Zen and American Pragmatism, pp. 114–117.
 Ozaki, Makoto, "On Tanabe's Logic of Species," in ΠΑΔΕΙΑ: Comparative Philosophy.
 Takahane, Yosuke, "Absolute Nothingness and Metanoetics,".
 Wattles, Jeffrey, "Dialectic and Religious Experience in Tanabe Hajime's Philosophy as Metanoetics"
 ———. Philosophy and Spiritual Experience: The case of a Japanese Shin Buddhist
 Yata, Ryosho. "An Examination of the Historical Development of the Concept of Two Aspects of Deep Belief, Part 1".

References

1889 births
1962 deaths
Japanese philosophers
Japanese scholars of Buddhism
Ontologists
Phenomenologists
Philosophers of mathematics
Philosophers of science
20th-century Japanese philosophers
People in interfaith dialogue
Existentialists
Buddhist existentialists
Academic staff of Kyoto University
Kyoto University alumni
Recipients of the Order of Culture
Academic staff of Tohoku University
Kyoto School
Heidegger scholars